Peter Rösch (15 September 1930 – 12 January 2006) was a Swiss football defender who played for Switzerland in the 1962 FIFA World Cup.  He also played for BSC Young Boys, Servette FC, and FC Sion. He later managed Sion, FC Martigny-Sports, and FC Épalinges.

References

1930 births
2006 deaths
Swiss men's footballers
Switzerland international footballers
1962 FIFA World Cup players
Association football defenders
FC Biel-Bienne players
BSC Young Boys players
FC Lausanne-Sport players
Servette FC players
FC Sion players
FC Monthey players
Swiss football managers
FC Sion managers
FC Martigny-Sports managers